Systasea is a genus of skipper butterflies in the family Hesperiidae.

The name Systasea was introduced as a replacement for the name Lintneria, which is invalid under the Law of Homonymy.

Species
Systasea microsticta Dyar, 1923
Systasea pulverulenta (R. Felder, 1869)
Systasea zampa (Edwards, 1876)

Identify
Outer margin of hindwing has two deep indentations.
Upperside is orange brown with darker olive-brown areas.
Forewing has a median band of transparent spots all in a row.
Wingspan: - inches (2.4-3.5 cm).

References

Pyrgini
Hesperiidae genera